HC Riviera Chișinău, also known as Riviera-SSSH-2 is a Moldovan handball team located in Chișinău. They compete in the National Super League of Moldova.

European record

Team

Current squad 

Squad for the 2016–17 season

  Adrian Bodrug
  Denis Ciciurca 
  Serghei Costin
  Roman Dodica  
  Ivan Ermuratii
  Adam Faqieh
  Artiom Gornostaev
  Alexei Groza 
  Igor Grumeza
  Victor Iurcu
  Valentin Ivancenco

  Ilia Jucov
  Victor Ledeniov
  Danil Martev
  Ion Nederita
  Aritom Rata
  Dmitrii Sepelev
  Sergiu Suhaci
  Nichita Tonciu
  Dinu Untu
  Eugen Vitvitchii

External links
 EHF Club Profile

Sport in Chișinău
Handball clubs
Handball in Moldova
Sports clubs in Moldova